Yifengdian is a town in Jimo District, Qingdao, Shandong province, China. , it has 99 villages under its administration: 
Yifengdian Village
Qiandian Village
Hougucheng Village
Linjiatuan Village
Houdian Village
Diqian Village
Majunzhai Village
Maogongbo Village
Guanzhuang Village
Shabu Village
Huanggezhuang Village
Sanwanzhuang Village
Dayuan Village
Jiaxi Village
Qiangucheng Village
Nanbu Village
Daba Village
Xiaoba Village
Lijiazhuang Village
Dazhuang Village
Hanjiazhuang Village
Dongqiao Village
Xiqiao Village
Shangbo Village
Gouxi Village
Hejiatun Village
Moujia Village
Sunjia Village
Zhenjiazhuang Village
Diandong Village
Malongtuan Village
Wali Village
Yuanshang Village
Huangjiazhuang Village
Taipingzhuang Village
Jiaojiazhuang Village
Nü'er Village
Fujia Village
Xujiagou Village
Dongzhujiazhuang Village
Wangjia Village
Zhangjia Village
Zhaojia Village
Hebeizhuang Village
Renjiazhuang Village
Xitaizhizhuang Village
Dongtaizhizhuang Village
Dongfengtai Village
Xifengtai Village
Zhujiazhuang Village
Gaojizhuang Village
Lengjiabu Village
Daotou Village
Dongheliuzhuang Village
Xiheliuzhuang Village
Sanli Village
Xiaolanjiazhuang Village
Xinjiatie Village
Caojiatun Village
Huangwa Village
Dalanjiazhuang Village
Wujiatun Village
Nanxinzhuang Village
Beixinzhuang Village
Fangzhuang Village
Qijixinan Village
Qijidongbei Village
Qijixibei Village
Qijidongnan Village
Zhanglizhuang Village
Xiqijidong Village
Xiqijixi Village
Houlügezhuang Village
Qianlügezhuang Village
Beichahe Village
Zhongchahe Village
Xilongwantou Village
Kangjiazhuang Village
Beizhangyuan Village
Zhongzhangyuan Village
Nanzhangyuan Village
Maozibu Village
Beizhu Village
Da'ougezhuang Village
Xiao'ougezhuang Village
Qingzhongbu Village
Zhongjianbu Village
Zhangwangzhuang Village
Quanzhuang Village
Xiejiatun Village
Balizhuang Village
Sangjiabu Village
Fengxiangzhuang Village
Tuanwanxinan Village
Tuanwanxibei Village
Tuanwandajie Village
Tuanwandongjie Village
Tuanwanshipeng Village
Qijiabu Village

See also 
 List of township-level divisions of Shandong

References 

Township-level divisions of Shandong
Geography of Qingdao
Towns in China